Frank Haskell may refer to:

 Frank A. Haskell (1828–1864), Union Army officer during the American Civil War
 Frank W. Haskell (1843–1903), member of the U.S. Army, who fought for the Union in the American Civil War, and Medal of Honor recipient